= British air services =

The term British air services most commonly refers to:

== During World War I ==
- Royal Flying Corps (1912 - 1918)
- Royal Naval Air Service (1914 - 1918)
- Royal Air Force (1918)

== Post World War I ==
- Royal Air Force (1918 onwards)
- Fleet Air Arm (1924–1937 as part of the Royal Air Force, 1937 onwards as part of the Royal Navy)
- Special Air Service (1941 onwards)
- Army Air Corps (United Kingdom) (1942 onwards)
